Lucille Love, Girl of Mystery is a 1914 American action film serial directed by Francis Ford. It was the first serial by Universal. It was originally intended to be a short subject. The serial is now considered to be lost with only four episodes surviving. Prints and/or fragments were found in the Dawson Film Find in 1978. The head of the Universal City Zoo, animal trainer Doc Kirby, was mauled by a lion during production and died shortly thereafter from a septic infection of the wound.

Cast
 Grace Cunard as Lucille Love
 Francis Ford as Loubeque / Hugo
 Harry Schumm as Lieutenant Gibson
 Ernest Shields as Thompson
 Edgar Keller as Sumpter Love (as E.M. Keller)
 Eddie Boland as Government Aviator
 Wilbur Higby
 Burton Law
 Jean Hathaway
 William White  (as Billy White)
 Harry L. Rattenberry
 John Ford  (as Jack Ford)

See also
 List of film serials
 List of film serials by studio

References

External links

1914 films
1914 lost films
1910s action films
American silent serial films
American black-and-white films
Universal Pictures film serials
Films directed by Francis Ford
Lost American films
American action films
Films with screenplays by Grace Cunard
Lost action films
1910s American films